Maulawi Dadullah may refer to:

Maulawi Dadullah  (–2007), Afghan Taliban leader
Maulawi Dadullah (Pakistani Taliban) (–2012), Pakistani Taliban leader